Thomas Beelen (born 11 June 2001) is a Dutch footballer who plays for PEC Zwolle.

Career
Beelen made his league debut in the Eredivisie on 23 April 2022 in a 2-0 win away against RKC Waalwijk. Soon after this he made his home league debut in the Eredivisie starting in a  2-1 defeat against PSV Eindhoven at the MAC³PARK Stadion. In June 2022, Beelen signed a professional contract with PEC Zwolle despite their relegation to the Eerste Divisie.

References

2001 births
Living people
PEC Zwolle players
Eerste Divisie players
Dutch footballers
Association football defenders